Znepole Ice Piedmont is the glacier extending 13 km in northwest-southeast direction and 7.5 km wide on Trinity Peninsula in Graham Land, Antarctica.  It lies south of Victory Glacier and northeast of Dreatin Glacier, and is bounded by Kondofrey Heights to the north and the 5.2 km long narrow rocky ridge featuring Mount Bradley to the west, flowing southeastwards into Prince Gustav Channel, Weddell Sea.

The feature is named after the Znepole region in Western Bulgaria

Location
German-British mapping in 1996.

Maps
 Trinity Peninsula. Scale 1:250000 topographic map No. 5697. Institut für Angewandte Geodäsie and British Antarctic Survey, 1996.
 Antarctic Digital Database (ADD). Scale 1:250000 topographic map of Antarctica. Scientific Committee on Antarctic Research (SCAR). Since 1993, regularly updated.

References
 Znepole Ice Piedmont. SCAR Composite Antarctic Gazetteer
 Bulgarian Antarctic Gazetteer. Antarctic Place-names Commission. (details in Bulgarian, basic data in English)

External links
 Znepole Ice Piedmont. Adjusted Copernix satellite image

Ice piedmonts of Graham Land
Landforms of Trinity Peninsula
Bulgaria and the Antarctic